An anatomical theatre was a specialised building or room, resembling a theatre, used in teaching anatomy at early modern universities. They were typically constructed with a tiered structure surrounding a central table, allowing a larger audience to see the dissection of cadavers more closely than would have been possible in a non-specialized setting.

Description 
An anatomical theatre was usually a room of roughly amphitheatrical shape, in the centre of which would stand a table on which the dissection of human or animal bodies took place. Around this table were several circular, elliptic or octagonal tiers with railings, steeply tiered so that observers (typically students) could stand and observe the dissection below, without spectators in the front-most rows blocking their view. It was common to display skeletons in some location within the theatre.

The first anatomical theatre, the Anatomical Theatre of Padua, was built at the University of Padua in 1594, and has been preserved into the modern day.

The anatomical theatre of the University of Uppsala is well-known, having been completed in 1663 by medical profession and amateur architect Olaus Rudbeck (1630-1702). The theatre is housed in the idiosyncratic cupola constructed on the top of the Gustavianum building, one of the older buildings of the university. Rudbeck had spent time in the Dutch city of Leiden, and the construction of both the anatomical theatre and the botanical garden he founded in Uppsala in 1655 were influenced by his experiences there. The anatomical theatre is now preserved as part of the Gustavianum, now preserved as a museum for the general public under the name Museum Gustavianum.

Thomas Jefferson built an anatomical theatre for the University of Virginia. It was completed in 1827, but demolished in 1939 after the construction of Alderman Library nearby.

In popular culture
In found footage horror podcast The White Vault, a team of researchers sent to repair an Arctic research station in Svalbard, Norway discover an anatomical theatre located at the center of a cave village.

Gallery

See also
History of anatomy
Operating theater

External links
  - A model of the anatomical theatre in Padua
  - Engraving of the anatomical theatre at Leiden University.
  - with an image of the Renaissance anatomical theatre at the Bologna University
  - has a section on Jefferson's anatomical theatre
 

 
History of anatomy
Italian inventions